Vasavi Mahila Kalasala is a college in Kurnool, Andhra Pradesh state in southern India. It is affiliated to Rayalaseema University.

References 

Colleges in Andhra Pradesh
Universities and colleges in Kurnool district
Kurnool
Educational institutions in India with year of establishment missing